Lake George station is a historic train station located at Lake George in Warren County, New York.  It was built between 1909 and 1911 by the Delaware and Hudson Railway, and is a one-story Mediterranean Revival style stuccoed frame building with a stuccoed brick tower.  It has a broad hipped clay tile roof and sits in a concrete foundation.  It features a tall, multi-story tower with a brick base and terra cotta upper sections with statuary enrichment. Rail service at Lake George ceased in 1958.

It was listed on the National Register of Historic Places in 2013 as the Delaware and Hudson Passenger Station.

References

Former Delaware and Hudson Railway stations
Railway stations on the National Register of Historic Places in New York (state)
Mediterranean Revival architecture in the United States
Railway stations in the United States opened in 1911
National Register of Historic Places in Warren County, New York
Former railway stations in New York (state)